Vesham is a 2004 Malayalam-language film directed by V. M. Vinu, produced by Swargachithra Appachan in which Mammootty in lead role. Innocent and  Gopika played other important roles.

Plot

The movie narrates the story of Appu, an elder brother who sacrifices his life for the younger one.

Appu, the M.D. of Leela Group of companies is a self-made businessman. He is a workaholic and still manages to make quality time for his family. He is married to Ashwathi. Appu's father Pappettan had a humble beginning as a porter.

Appu's brother Hari returns after getting MBA from England and marries Revathy. All these people stay together as a joint family. Appu has many enemies in the business field, the most important among them being Sivan, the M.D. of Bharath Motors, who wants to destroy Leela Group. Sivan tries to influence Hari through his secretary Veni and her lover Deepak. Hari has already been creating problems at the office as well as at home but Appu tolerates it. The story takes a turn with the accidental death of Deepak which was actually committed by Hari. In order to save his brother's life, Appu confesses to the murder. The rest of the movie deals with Sivan's attempt to take over Leela Group and how Appu takes revenge as well as the agony associated with it.

Cast

Soundtrack 
The song 'Oho Minnale' was composed in the same tune as in the song 'Aha Jumtaka' from S. A. Rajkumar's musical Kannada film Chandra Chakori.

Release
The film received generally positive response upon release.

Awards 
The film won three Asianet Film Awards in 2004.

 Best Actor – Mammootty
 Best Supporting Actor - Innocent
 Best Supporting Actress - Gopika

References

External links
 

2004 films
2000s Malayalam-language films
Indian films based on actual events
Films shot in Kozhikode
Films directed by V. M. Vinu